The 2010–11 season was FC Barcelona's 111th in existence and the club's 80th consecutive season in the top flight of Spanish football. Barcelona started the season with a new president after Joan Laporta reached his term limit on 30 June, leaving behind a very successful club tenure.

Sandro Rosell was elected president on 13 June by securing a record total of 35,021 votes (61.35%), more than the 27,138 achieved by Laporta in 2003. Rosell began his tenure on 1 July as the 39th president in Barcelona's history.

This team is widely considered to be the greatest in Barcelona's history. Former Manchester United manager Sir Alex Ferguson has described this squad as the best he had ever faced.

Season overview

June
Barcelona started their transfer window only three days after the end of the 2009–10 season, by reaching an agreement with Valencia for Spanish international David Villa worth €40 million.

On 30 June, Xavier Sala-i-Martin, treasurer and director in charge of the economic area, announced that Barcelona earned a record €445.5 million in revenue during the 2009–10 season. According to Xavier, "that's the highest revenues achieved by any club, in any sport including the U.S." This means FC Barcelona is the richest club in the world in terms of revenue.

Coach Pep Guardiola later expressed disapproval of the transfer of Ukrainian centre-back Dmytro Chyhrynskyi, indicating he was pressed to let him go. Speaking at a press-conference, Guardiola said, "My opinion counts, but the needs of the club go above that and that's why he was sold, I would like to have kept him." Speaking on the departing Yaya Touré, Guardiola said he would have preferred him to stay, but the player was set on moving.

On 14 July, Thierry Henry and Barcelona agreed to rescind his contract in order for Henry to become a free agent, where he subsequently signed a new four-and-a-half year contract with Major League Soccer's New York Red Bulls. He stated, "This is a new and exciting chapter in my career." The club also agreed with Pep Guardiola on a one-year extension to stay as coach of the first team, along with long-time assistant Tito Vilanova.

August
On 27 August, Barcelona reached an agreement with English club Liverpool for the services of Argentine international Javier Mascherano. The deal was worth €24 million and was reached "after considerable effort from the club [Barcelona] over the last few hours and the willingness and desire of the player to make the move". On the same day, Barcelona's executive committee of the board of directors publicly "denounced the conduct over the last few days of the agent of our player Zlatan Ibrahimović, Mino Raiola, whose declarations have put into question the honour and moral integrity of our coach Pep Guardiola". The club's legal department considered the possibility of rescinding the contract and the cessation of the annual payment Raiola's company receives from the club as part of their agreement. The next day, Barcelona and Italian club Milan agreed to a one-year loan for the Swedish international, with Milan paying all his earnings for the 2010–11 season and including in the agreement the option for Milan to make the move permanent next summer for a fee of €24 million.

September
Coach Guardiola stated, "It will cost us a lot. We expect a difficult year in which things have to be won by ourselves. Right now, the team is not at full strength at this point in the season."

On 19 September, Lionel Messi suffered an ankle injury due to an ill-advised tackle by Atlético Madrid defender Tomáš Ujfaluši in the 92nd minute of their Round Three match at the Vicente Calderón Stadium. At first sight, it was feared that Messi suffered a broken ankle that could have kept the star player away from the pitch for a minimum of six months, but MRIs performed the next day in Barcelona showed he suffered a sprain in the internal and external ligaments of his right ankle. Teammate David Villa stated "the tackle on Messi was brutal" after watching the video of the play and also added that he believed the Atlético defender "didn't go into the tackle to hurt". The incident caused widespread media attention because of Messi's high profile in the football world and brought up the debate of equality in protecting all players in the game. Debates whether the fact that Messi's status prompted the intensive media and fans scrutiny of Ujfaluši and subsequent two match ban by the Competition Committee
appeared all over the internet, television, and print in the days following the incident.

October
Due to the findings of the audit, Barcelona compromisarios (commissioners) voted to enforce the social action of responsibility against the club's previous board with 468 in favour, 439 against and 113 abstaining. Ex-president Laporta's board will be called upon to respond in court due to €48.7 million that went missing during his presidency.

On 18 October, Laporta defended his presidency in front of the media by stating that, "We just want them to give us the documentation regarding the biased and demagogic statement made by the representative of KPMG." He also stated, "The board has not had the courage to explain things", and, "We have nothing to hide, everything has its explanation and justification." Laporta did not hold back and branded the new president "envious, resentful and jealous" and "I have a very clear conscience and the truth on my side". He continue to berate the new board by stating, "My greatest desire after spending a few years of my life at Barça and the results we got was to become a socio, go back to my seat, go to football games with my kids and enjoy this club. They do not let me. And not only do they not let me, but I see some attempts to ridicule, dishonor the reputation we have. No way I'm left alone. After the assembly of delegates, I understand that there was an indecent maneuver with the exposure of the 'due diligence'... It was sectarian, demagogic and an interest to scorn against me and create an alarm among the social mass."

November
On 29 November, one of the most eagerly-awaited Clásico in recent times was scheduled on a Monday due to the elections to the Parliament of Catalonia, which was held on the day before. The match featured 13 of the 23 winning players on Spain's 2010 FIFA World Cup squad and currently the two most successful managers in football, with Pep Guardiola and Real Madrid's José Mourinho. The match itself was a complete domination by Barcelona, with an emphatic 5–0 trashing of their eternal rival. The game showcased Barça's mastering of the tiki-taka in combination with the Total Football philosophy and the superb team-work of whom many consider the top three players in the world: Messi, Xavi and Andrés Iniesta. The international press hailed Barcelona's impressive win and their football as currently the best in the game, while some questioned whether the Real Madrid squad was "ready" for the magnitude of this match.

Guardiola stated, "it was a spectacle" and "how we did it – that makes us proud. Now just let us sit back and enjoy that win – we'll reflect and look at the whole game, but now it would be wrong not to revel in the win. Games like that happen very rarely indeed". In regards to Madrid, Pep stated, "This match isn't representative of the difference between the two teams. They are a very good team, they came here unbeaten and as league leaders. Today all of our players played well and that was the difference."

After the victory, Barcelona took over first place in La Liga's table, ahead of Madrid by two points with 25 rounds left to play.

December
On 6 December, the finalists for the FIFA Ballon d'Or were announced. Barcelona players (Messi, Xavi and Iniesta) took all three spots, with the results to be declared on 10 January in Zürich. This was a monumental moment for Barcelona, as the three best players in the world were not only from the club, but all three came from Barcelona's youth system at La Masia.

On 13 December, president Rosell made final the signing of a five-and-a-half-year, €170 million shirt sponsorship with the Qatar Foundation, thus ending Barça's tradition of not having paid sponsors on their shirt. The deal made it the highest paid shirt sponsorship in the world, beating both Manchester United's deal with Aon and Liverpool's deal with Standard Chartered reached the prior year.

January
On 10 January, Lionel Messi was crowned the 2010 FIFA Ballon d'Or winner. His teammates Andrés Iniesta and Xavi finished second and third respectively. Messi became the first player to win the new prize after the FIFA World Player of the Year and Ballon d'Or merged to become the FIFA Ballon d'Or. He also became the first player since Marco van Basten to win the Ballon d'Or and Ronaldinho the FIFA World Player of the Year in consecutive years after an impressive year in which he tallied 60 goals in 64 games.

On 19 January, Barça's team record of 28 matches unbeaten was ended after being defeated 3–1 by Real Betis of the Segunda División in the second leg of their quarter-finals tie of the Copa del Rey. Barcelona, however, advanced to the semi-finals on a 6–3 aggregate score after winning the first leg at the Camp Nou 5–0.

On 29 January, Barça defeated Hércules 0–3 to match the record for most consecutive league wins in a La Liga season, at 15.  The record was previously set by Real Madrid during the 1960–61 season.

February
On 2 February, both Barcelona and Real Madrid advanced to the Final of the Copa del Rey by defeating Almería (8–0 on aggregate) and Sevilla (0–3 on aggregate), respectively. This was the first final between the Spanish giants after 21 years in the making when the clubs last faced in 1990 with Barça winning 2–0 at the Mestalla Stadium in Valencia.

On 5 February, Barcelona broke the record for most consecutive league wins with 16 victories after they defeated Atlético Madrid 3–0 at Camp Nou. Lionel Messi scored a hat-trick to ensure the victory for his side and after the match stated, "It's an honor to be able to pass a record set by a great like Di Stéfano" and, "If the record has been around for so long is because it's very complicated to achieve and we have reached it by defeating a very difficult team who's going through a bad situation, which makes it even more difficult."

March
On 2 March, Adriano assisted Lionel Messi to score a late goal and give Barcelona a 0–1 away win against Valencia. Messi now tallied 27 goals in La Liga for the season, keeping him in the running for the Pichichi Trophy as top scorer.

On 8 March, Barça eliminated Arsenal from the Champions League in a 3–1 win at the Camp Nou with a 4–3 aggregate score. Barcelona dominated all offensive categories and limited Arsenal to zero shots for the whole match, with their lone goal coming off an own goal by Sergio Busquets. But the match was not without controversy after Arsenal forward Robin van Persie was sent off for a second yellow card for what referee Massimo Busacca interpreted as "time wasting" after the player kicked the ball towards goal after the referee had blown the whistle on him for being called offside by the linesman.

On 14 March, Spanish radio station Cadena COPE reported that Real Madrid would request for the Royal Spanish Football Federation (RFEF) to tighten its control on doping in the league. According to the report, Real Madrid was suspicious to why Eufemiano Fuentes was allowed to work for Valencia when they won the league in the early 2000s and why are doctors with "doubtful reputation" are working at Barcelona. Barcelona, in defence, released a statement "publicly expressing its total indignation at these unfounded references which link the club to doping practices and to condemn such attitudes, which have nothing to do with fair play and gravely affect the image of sporting competition". It also stated "its legal department is studying possible legal action to defend the club's honour, alongside that of its coaching staff, players and medical staff and is prepared to take such action to its final consequences". COPE later issued an apology, stating, "our objective is to inform. In no case, did we participate in a campaign to defame or bring doubts to Spanish clubs or athletes."

On 15 March, Barcelona's secretary and spokesperson Toni Freixa appeared in a press conference to make public that Barcelona would sue Cadena COPE after the reports implicating Barcelona in doping. He stated that "yesterday [14 March], FC Barcelona released a statement and, paralleled, sent a fax to Cadena COPE requesting the rectification and the origin of the grave report of defamation. The rest of the day it waited for the express and convincing rectification of the report." He also added, "since this correction has not occurred satisfactorily and whether they can finally be produced, for the serious attack on the reputation and good name of FC Barcelona, for their athletes and doctors, a fact that we cannot leave unpunished, FC Barcelona announced to act with firmness and force that the gravity of the offense deserves. In the coming days it will request at first instance with the Barcelona's courts an order of protection of their right to honor claims for damages caused by those responsible for defamation."

On the same day, Barcelona announced that French international defender Eric Abidal was diagnosed with a tumour on his liver which would be operated on the Friday of the same week. Citing privacy concerns as wished by the player, the club did not release additional information in regards to his condition. In response to the announcement, players and fans from all over the world alike dedicated well wishes for the ill player on multiple social networking sites and sports websites. Before their Round of 16 match in the Champions League, both Real Madrid and Lyon players exited the pitch wearing "Ánimo Abidal" ("Strength Abidal") written on T-shirts, along with the same message on the Santiago Bernabéu Stadium's scoreboards in show of support and solidarity.

April
On 2 April, Barcelona defeated Villarreal 1–0 at El Madrigal with five missing starters due to injuries and rest with a goal in the 66th minute from Centre back Gerard Piqué. With the victory, they increased their league lead to eight points after Real Madrid's 1–0 shock loss to Sporting de Gijón at the Santiago Bernabéu.

On 12 April, Barcelona defeated Shakhtar Donetsk 0–1 at the Donbass Arena in Donetsk to reach their fourth consecutive semi-finals appearance in the Champions League with a 6–1 aggregate score. Lionel Messi assured the victory with a goal in the 43rd minute to take his season tally to 48 goals in all competitions, breaking the club's mark of 47 goals set by himself last season and Ronaldo in the 1996–97 season.

On 16 April, the first of four Clásicos was disputed at the Santiago Bernabéu, ending in 1–1 with penalty goals respectively by Messi (53rd minute) and Cristiano Ronaldo (82nd minute). The draw ended Barcelona's Clásico winning streak at five since manager Pep Guardiola took over the side for the 2008–09 season. The match was the start of four Clásicos between the two Spanish giants, including the league, Copa del Rey Final and the semi-finals of the Champions League.

On 20 April, Barcelona lost the final of the Copa del Rey to Real Madrid 0–1 after extra time, with Cristiano Ronaldo scoring the winning goal in the 103rd minute. The defeat was a first for Guardiola in a finals match and ended his unbeaten streak against Real Madrid since he became first team coach.

On 27 April, Barcelona and Real Madrid met at the Santiago Bernabéu in Madrid for the first leg of their Champions League semi-final tie. Although Barcelona enjoyed most of the possession throughout the first half of the game, it was not until the sending off of Real Madrid's Pepe that the game swung to Barcelona's favour, with Lionel Messi scoring twice in the closing minutes to give Barcelona a 2−0 first-leg victory. With those two goals, Lionel Messi had scored 11 goals in 11 Champions League matches.

The match was not without controversy, however, as both teams exhibited what most consider to be the "dark arts" of football. Real Madrid manager José Mourinho accused UEFA of playing favorites to Barcelona after he was ejected for mocking the fourth official after Pepe's red card. At the press conference following the match, Mourinho stated that UEFA's referees have been assisting Barcelona for the past three years. Barcelona's back-up goalkeeper José Manuel Pinto saw a red card at half-time for a scuffle with Real Madrid's defender Álvaro Arbeloa when both teams went to the locker rooms. The match was marred by more incidents of diving, play-acting and violence in what many consider to be one of the worst Clásicos in recent times.

UEFA officials released a statement stating they have opened disciplinary cases against the clubs to be heard by the UEFA Control and Disciplinary Body on Friday 6 May.

On 30 April, Barcelona's 32-games unbeaten run came to an end after a 2–1 loss to Real Sociedad at Anoeta Stadium.

May
On 3 May, Barcelona booked a trip to Wembley Stadium for the UEFA Champions League Final after a 1–1 draw  (3–1 aggregate) with Real Madrid at Camp Nou. Pedro sealed it with a 54th-minute goal.

On 11 May, Barcelona clinched its third consecutive La Liga title with a 1–1 draw against Levante at the Estadi Ciutat de València. The result gave Barcelona a six-point lead with two matches remaining which, combined with their superior head-to-head record with Real Madrid, ensured that they finished top of the table. Barcelona led the table since defeating Madrid 5–0 back in November and since then, they have only lost one match en route to winning the title. It was the third straight title for manager Guardiola, who became the first manager to do so in his first three seasons managing in La Liga.

On 21 May, Barcelona finish its league season with a win 1–3 over Málaga at La Rosaleda Stadium while playing most of its back-up and canterano players. Goals from Bojan, Ibrahim Afellay and Marc Bartra assured the victory and a club record of 14 away victories.

On 28 May, Barcelona clinched its fourth Champions League trophy with a 3–1 victory over Manchester United at Wembley Stadium. The Barcelona attack, spearheaded by its three forwards of Messi, David Villa and Pedro, of whom all scored a goal, dominated United. The all-Spanish midfield three of Xavi, Iniesta and Busquets assisted a goal each as well. Messi was awarded Man of the Match and with his goal he matches Ruud van Nistelrooy as the all-time top season scorer with 12 goals in this year's version.

Players

Squad information

Total squad cost: €154.5 million

From youth system 
As of 1 September 2010.

Players in / out

In 

Total spending:  €71.5 million

Out 

Total income:   €67.5 million.

Expenditure:  €4 million.

Player statistics

Team stats
{|class="wikitable" style="text-align: center;"
|-
!
!La Liga
!Champions League
!Copa del Rey
!Total Stats
|-
|align=left| Games played          || 38 || 13 || 9 || 60
|-
|align=left| Games won             || 30 || 9 || 5 || 44 
|-
|align=left| Games drawn           || 6 || 3 || 2 || 11
|-
|align=left| Games lost            || 2 || 1 || 2 || 5
|-
|align=left| Goals for             || 95 || 30 || 22  || 147
|-
|align=left| Goals against         || 21 || 9 || 6 || 36
|-
|align=left| Shots                 || 588 || 198 || 135 || 921
|-
|align=left| Corners for           || 254 || 59 || 67 || 380
|-
|align=left| Corners against       || 137 || 24 || 30 || 191
|-
|align=left| Players used          || 28 || 26 || 25 || 29
|-
|align=left| Offsides              || 148 || 46 || 30 || 224
|-
|align=left| Fouls received        || 537 || 204 || 138 || 879
|-
|align=left| Fouls committed       || 390 || 132 || 87 || 609
|-
|align=left| Yellow cards          || 73 || 12 || 10 || 95
|-
|align=left| Red cards             || 2 || 1 || 0 || 3
|-

Squad stats

Disciplinary records

Last updated on 28 May.

Club

Technical staff

Pre-season and friendlies

Competitions

Overall
Barcelona was present in all major competitions: La Liga, the UEFA Champions League and the Copa del Rey.

Supercopa de España

La Liga

League table

Results summary

Results by round

Matches

Copa del Rey

Round of 32

Round of 16

Quarter-finals

Semi-finals

Final

UEFA Champions League

Group stage

Knockout phase

Round of 16

Quarter-finals

Semi-finals

Final

References

External links
 

Spanish football clubs 2010–11 season
2010-11
2010-11
2010–11 in Catalan football
2010–11 UEFA Champions League participants seasons
2010-11
12